Oedaspis semihyalina is a species of tephritid or fruit flies in the genus Oedaspis of the family Tephritidae.

Distribution
Australia.

References

Tephritinae
Insects described in 1996
Diptera of Australasia